Niclas Bergmark (born 7 January 2002) is a Swedish football defender who plays for Örebro SK. He is a grandson of former Swedish international Orvar Bergmark and first cousin of Adam Bergmark Wiberg.

References

2002 births
Living people
Swedish footballers
Association football defenders
Örebro SK players
Allsvenskan players
Superettan players
Sweden youth international footballers
Sweden under-21 international footballers